5th Congress may refer to:
5th Congress of the Communist Party of Yugoslavia (1948)
5th Congress of the Philippines (1962–1965)
5th Congress of the Russian Social Democratic Labour Party (1907)
5th Congress of the Workers' Party of Korea (1970)
5th National Congress of the Chinese Communist Party (1927)
5th National Congress of the Communist Party of Vietnam (1982)
5th National Congress of the Kuomintang (1935)
5th National Congress of the Lao People's Revolutionary Party (1991)
5th National People's Congress (1978–1983)
5th United States Congress (1797–1799)
Hague Congress (1872), the 5th Congress of the First International
International Socialist Congress, Paris 1900, the 5th Congress of the Second International